Acacia irrorata, known colloquially as green wattle or blueskin, is a species of Acacia which is native to eastern Australia.

References

irrorata
Fabales of Australia
Flora of New South Wales
Flora of Queensland